The 2021 PDC Unicorn Development Tour were a series of events that were part of the 2021 PDC Pro Tour.

Following the COVID-19 pandemic, it was decided that both the Challenge Tour and the Development Tour would be split, with there being 12 events for UK-based players, and 12 for EU-based players.

The winners of each would earn a PDC Tour Card, qualify for the 2022 PDC World Darts Championship, as well as earn a place at the 2021 Grand Slam of Darts.

Prize money
The prize money for the Development Tour events remained the same from 2020, with each event having a prize fund of £10,000.

This is how the prize money is divided:

UK Development Tour

UK Development Tour 1 
UK Development Tour 1 was contested on Friday 20 August 2021 at the Marshall Arena in Milton Keynes.

UK Development Tour 2
UK Development Tour 2 was contested on Friday 20 August 2021 at the Marshall Arena in Milton Keynes.

UK Development Tour 3 
UK Development Tour 3 was contested on Saturday 21 August 2021 at the Marshall Arena in Milton Keynes.

UK Development Tour 4
UK Development Tour 4 was contested on Saturday 21 August 2021 at the Marshall Arena in Milton Keynes.

UK Development Tour 5 
UK Development Tour 5 was contested on Sunday 22 August 2021 at the Marshall Arena in Milton Keynes.

UK Development Tour 6
UK Development Tour 6 was contested on Sunday 22 August 2021 at the Marshall Arena in Milton Keynes.

UK Development Tour 7 
UK Development Tour 7 was contested on Friday 29 October 2021 at the Barnsley Metrodome in Barnsley.

UK Development Tour 8
UK Development Tour 8 was contested on Friday 29 October 2021 at the Barnsley Metrodome in Barnsley.

UK Development Tour 9 
UK Development Tour 9 was contested on Saturday 30 October 2021 at the Barnsley Metrodome in Barnsley.

UK Development Tour 10
UK Development Tour 10 was contested on Saturday 30 October 2021 at the Barnsley Metrodome in Barnsley.

UK Development Tour 11 
UK Development Tour 11 was contested on Sunday 31 October 2021 at the Barnsley Metrodome in Barnsley.

UK Development Tour 12
UK Development Tour 12 was contested on Sunday 31 October 2021 at the Barnsley Metrodome in Barnsley.

European Development Tour

European Development Tour 1 
European Development Tour 1 was contested on Friday 20 August 2021 at the H+ Hotel in Niedernhausen.

European Development Tour 2
European Development Tour 2 was contested on Friday 20 August 2021 at the H+ Hotel in Niedernhausen.

European Development Tour 3 
European Development Tour 3 was contested on Saturday 21 August 2021 at the H+ Hotel in Niedernhausen.

European Development Tour 4
European Development Tour 4 was contested on Saturday 21 August 2021 at the H+ Hotel in Niedernhausen.

European Development Tour 5 
European Development Tour 5 was contested on Sunday 22 August 2021 at the H+ Hotel in Niedernhausen.

European Development Tour 6
European Development Tour 6 was contested on Sunday 22 August 2021 at the H+ Hotel in Niedernhausen.

European Development Tour 7 
European Development Tour 7 was contested on Friday 5 November 2021 at the H+ Hotel in Niedernhausen.

European Development Tour 8
European Development Tour 8 was contested on Friday 5 November 2021 at the H+ Hotel in Niedernhausen.

European Development Tour 9 
European Development Tour 9 was contested on Saturday 6 November 2021 at the H+ Hotel in Niedernhausen.

European Development Tour 10
European Development Tour 10 was contested on Saturday 6 November 2021 at the H+ Hotel in Niedernhausen.

European Development Tour 11 
European Development Tour 11 was contested on Sunday 7 November 2021 at the H+ Hotel in Niedernhausen.

European Development Tour 12
European Development Tour 12 was contested on Sunday 7 November 2021 at the H+ Hotel in Niedernhausen.

References

2021 in darts
2021 PDC Pro Tour